Jarrod Harbrow (born 18 July 1988) is a former professional Australian rules footballer who played for the Gold Coast Football Club in the Australian Football League (AFL).

Early life
Harbrow was born in Cairns to an Indigenous Australian mother from Cairns and a Caucasian father from Mooroopna, Victoria. His indigenous ancestry can be traced to the Yirrganydji, a rainforest tribe in Far North Queensland. He grew up in the town of Cairns, in Queensland and began playing junior football with the Manunda Hawks and then the South Cairns in the AFL Cairns competition. He attended Woree State School while based in Cairns.

When Harbrow was 13, his brother was rushed to the Townsville Hospital after being diagnosed with leukemia. As a result, Jarrod moved to Townsville with his family for one year and gave his brother bone marrow to survive leukemia. He continued to play junior football for the Hermit Park Tigers and attended Townsville Grammar School.

In 2005, at the age of 16, Harbrow moved to country Victoria where he played for the Mooroopna Football Club before joining the TAC Cup side the Murray Bushrangers in a bid to nominate for the AFL Draft. He represented Queensland at both the 2004 AFL Under 16 Championships and 2006 AFL Under 18 Championships, both sides winning the respective division titles. 

He was overlooked in the 2006 AFL Draft, however had already attracted the attention of AFL talent scouts Peter Dean and Scott Clayton.

AFL career
Drafted as a rookie, Harbrow was picked up by the Bulldogs in the 2007 rookie draft.

Following only a short time in development playing for the Bulldogs VFL affiliate Werribee, Harbrow was called up for his AFL debut against the Richmond Tigers in Round 4, 2007.

He has since become a senior regular and impressed with his pace, skill, defensive pressure and evasive running abilities.

In 2009, after struggling to get a game in the first few weeks of the season, he was thrown into defence against North Melbourne. Since then, he was often seen among the Bulldogs' best, became a regular senior player. He had many highlights in 2009 and shut down some of the league's best small forwards, including Matt Campbell, Stephen Milne, Brad Dick, and Mathew Stokes.

At the conclusion of the 2010 season, the Bulldogs confirmed Jarrod would be the newest uncontracted player to join the Gold Coast Suns. Jarrod wasted no time with the announcement to the football world, coming just days after the Bulldogs' loss to St Kilda in the preliminary final. After being the subject of much speculation all year, the lure of returning home to Queensland proved too strong, despite the Bulldogs' best efforts to retain the rebounding damaging defender.

Jarrod was the fifth uncontracted player from an AFL club to join the Suns.

Jarrod played his 100th AFL game in Round 18, 2012 against . In round 7, 2016 he became the first Gold Coast player to play 100 AFL games.

In round 19, 2018, Harbrow became the first Gold Coast player to play 150 games for the club. The club board ratified the decision to award him life membership. He also won The Gold Coast Club Champion award in 2018, Gold Coast's Best & Fairest award. 

On August 17th, 2021, Harbrow announced that he would retire after the Suns season finale against the Sydney Swans. He played 262 games and is the Gold Coast's games record holder, with 192 games.

References

External links

1988 births
Indigenous Australian players of Australian rules football
Australian rules footballers from Queensland
Gold Coast Football Club players
Western Bulldogs players
Werribee Football Club players
Murray Bushrangers players
Sportspeople from Cairns
Living people
Australia international rules football team players
Gold Coast Suns Club Champion winners